Route 200 is a state highway in northeastern Connecticut, running entirely within Thompson. It connects the town center to I-395.

Route description

Route 200 begins at an intersection with Route 12 within the town of Thompson. It heads east and southeast, intersecting I-395 at Exit 50
about  later. It then continues on its southeast track until it ends at an intersection with Route 193 in Thompson center.

History
Most of modern Route 200 was part of the Thompson Turnpike, which was part of a route between Providence and Springfield. In 1922, Route 200 and the piece of modern Route 193 between Route 12 and Thompson center, was designated as State Highway 185, a loop route of New England Route 12 to serve Thompson center. Modern Route 200 was established as part of the 1932 state highway renumbering, and originally extended southeast of Thompson center along Quaddick Road to the village of Quaddick. As part of the 1962 Route Reclassification Act, Route 200 was truncated to end at Route 193 in Thompson center. In the late 1960s, an interchange with I-395 (then Route 52) was constructed.

Junction list

References

External links

200
Transportation in Windham County, Connecticut